Affirming Pentecostal Church International (APCI) is a Pentecostal denomination. It is currently the largest LGBT affirming Pentecostal organization in the World.

History 
It was founded December 5, 2010 in Indianapolis, Indiana.

APCI was founded to be a non-legalistic Apostolic Pentecostal organization with racial equanimity not found in other similar types of organizations.

APCI has established congregations in the US, Albania, Mexico, Colombia, Brazil, Portugal, Kenya, Uganda, Tanzania, Zimbabwe, Ecuador, Nigeria, Ghana, Argentina, South Africa, United Kingdom, Cuba and Guatemala, and is working toward establishing churches in Montenegro, Ethiopia, Cameroon, Madagascar, Taiwan and Trinidad. APCI also has extensive ministries in Nigeria, through their Chicago church, High Praises International Ministries. The church holds General Conference each year, usually in July.

Leadership
Bishop Erik D. Swope-Wise is the Presiding Bishop, and Bishop Alfredo Peña is Associate Bishop. Temporal authority, however, is vested in the General Board, which includes Bishop Jabowa Whitehead (Overseer General), Ref. Jessica Jackson (treasurer) and Rev. Kelsey Swope-Wise (General secretary).

Beliefs
In matters of doctrine, their beliefs are similar to those of most Pentecostal churches: the deity of Christ, water baptism by full immersion in the name of the father and the son and the Holy Spirit which is Jesus Christ for forgiveness of sins, the baptism of the Holy Ghost, and holiness of life and heart. APCI adheres firmly to these teachings, and does not give ministerial credentials to those holding other beliefs.

APCI is a fully affirming church open to all persons. Unlike most Pentecostal churches, APCI is LGBT-affirming. Their anti-discrimination policy includes numerous categories, including race, sexual orientation, and gender identity. Unlike most other Pentecostal churches, APCI does not believe that being homosexual, bisexual or transgender is sinful. They base this view on their understanding of the Hebrew and Greek texts of scripture, as do other LGBT Affirming Apostolic organizations.

Newsletter
APCI publishes a quarterly newsletter in PDF format, The Apostolic Voice, which is distributed free of charge via email and online.

See also
 Gay Apostolic Pentecostals

References

External links

Pentecostal churches in Indiana
Pentecostal denominations in North America
Christian organizations established in 2010
2010 establishments in Indiana
LGBT churches in the United States
Religion in Indianapolis